Etheric Networks is an Internet Service Provider based in San Mateo, California serving the San Francisco Bay Area. It specializes in high-speed Internet access using wireless technologies. Fixed wireless towers using ISM and U-NII band transmissions connect end users to its fiber optic backbone.

History

In March 2003, Etheric Networks launches ISP service via its first generation broadband fixed wireless local loop WLL access network, via the Qwest co-location center in Sunnyvale and Black Mountain, a communication tower complex at 2,800 feet above sea level, overlooking Silicon Valley and the Peninsula.

References

External links
 
 SVBJ on Etheric, Silicon Valley Business Journal

Companies based in Redwood City, California
Companies established in 2000
Internet service providers of the United States